The Best of Times is a 1981 television pilot episode directed by Don Mischer that was never picked up as a series. It also features the acting debuts of Crispin Glover and Nicolas Cage.

Plot
A variety show about life as a teenager as seen through the eyes of eight actual teenagers (Crispin, Julie, Jill, Nicolas, Kevin, Lisa, David and Janet) who perform skits, songs and dances that relate their views between childhood and adulthood.

Cast
Crispin Glover as Crispin
Jill Schoelen as Jill
Nicolas Cage as Nicolas (credited as Nicolas Coppola)
Julie Piekarski as Julie
Kevin Cortes as Kevin
Lisa Hope Ross as Lisa
David Rambo as David
Janet Robin as Janet
Jackie Mason as Mr. O'Reilly
Betty Glover as Crispin's Mother

External links

1981 American television episodes
American television series premieres
Television pilots not picked up as a series
ABC network original films
1981 comedy films
Television films as pilots
1980s English-language films